

Achievements
Won awards including Dolly Cursetji's competition in 1956 as a student.
Won several prizes in the exhibition of the Bombay Art Society and State Art Exhibitions of Maharashtra.

Exhibitions
Gallery Oasis, Mumbai- 1969.
Chamarajendra Academy of Visual Arts, Mysore – 1985.
Chetana Art Gallery, Mumbai- 1988.
Jehangir Art Gallery, Mumbai- 1997.

Paintings in Collection
Nagpur Museum, Nagpur.
Government of Karnataka.
Larsen & Tubro.
Gadkari Rangaytan, Thane.
Dr. M.D Deshmukh.

Portrait Demonstrations
Nootan Kala Mandir, Mumbai- 1958.
Raheja School Of Art, Bandra, Mumbai- 1959, 1977, 1982.
Dept. of English, Mumbai University, 1971, 1973.
Kala Niketan, Kolhapur- 1978.
Dalvi's Institute of Art, Kolhapur- 1978.
Dept. of Painting, Udaipur University, 1977.
Rajasthan school of art, Jaipur- 1978.
Indira Kala Sangit Vishwavidyalaya, Khairagarh. M.P – 1975, 1977, 1978.
Chitrakala MAhavidyalaya, Nagpur- 1979.
Abhinav Kala Mahavidyalaya, Pune- 1977, 81, 82, 86, 87, 88, 91.
Chamarajendra Academy of Visual Arts, Mysore – 1985.

Achievements as art critic.
Started writing Art-criticism, under the pen-name "Virupaksha" in tha "Mauj", a prestigious weekly in Marathi, Since, 1958.which was considered as the most unbias and illuminating.
 He started writing by his own name since, 1961, in the "Satyakatha" and other periodicals in Marathi, Devoted Seriously to Literature and Art.

Literature
"Palasban" book of poems in Marathi, published by "Mouj".
He has directed a play " Aarsa Bolto", in Marathi, the first one-act play by the Marathi Play Writer & poet Shri. C.T. Khanolkar, Where the dramatic talent of Shri. Amol Palekar, the then student of Sir. J.J School of Art, was discovered for the first time.

Achievements as a musician and musicologist
Known as a Harmonium soloist.
He has written articles on music, discussing the musicological and aesthetic problems. He has also studied Musicology, especially the "Shruti" intervals or the micro-tonic intervals in Indian music.

References

20th-century Indian painters
Living people
1932 births
Marathi people
Indian portrait painters
People from Deoghar district
Painters from Maharashtra